Axinidris tridens is a species of ant in the genus Axinidris. Described by Arnold in 1946, the species is endemic to Malawi, where they were collected from partially decaying trees.

References

Axinidris
Hymenoptera of Africa
Insects described in 1946